is a Japanese football player currently featuring for Tochigi City FC.

Career
Oshima previously played for Kashiwa Reysol in the J. League Division 1. After a decade in Nagano, Oshima joined Tochigi City FC in December 2019.

Club statistics
Updated to 23 February 2020.

References

External links
Profile at Nagano Parceiro

1988 births
Living people
People from Noda, Chiba
Association football people from Chiba Prefecture
Japanese footballers
J1 League players
J3 League players
Japan Football League players
Kashiwa Reysol players
AC Nagano Parceiro players
Tochigi City FC players
Association football defenders